Saturday Night Rove, also referred to as Saturday Night, is an Australian television variety show hosted by comedian Rove McManus. The program premiered on Network Ten on 24 August 2019 and aired on Saturdays at 7:30 pm. It featured a mixture of live and pre-recorded entertainment, including skits, live crosses, guest interviews, pranks, challenges and comedy acts & routines.

The show was produced by Rove McManus' Roving Enterprises and first appeared as a pilot episode screened on 24 August 2018. A season for 2019, with 6 episodes, was commissioned by Network Ten in October 2018 and premiered on 24 August 2019, however after only 2 episodes being aired, the show was axed due to disappointing ratings.

Cast
 Rove McManus
 Alex Lee
 Alex Jae
 Justin Hamilton
 Voice of Judith Lucy

Episodes

Ratings

See also

List of Australian television series
Rove Live
Hey Hey It's Saturday
Saturday Night Live
Chris & Julia's Sunday Night Takeaway
Ant & Dec's Saturday Night Takeaway
The Project

References

External links 
 
 

Network 10 original programming
Australian variety television shows
Australian comedy television series
2019 Australian television series debuts
2019 Australian television series endings
Television shows set in Sydney
Television shows set in Melbourne
English-language television shows